Eight ships of the Royal Navy have been named HMS Jersey after the island of Jersey, part of the Channel Islands; including

 , a frigate commissioned in 1654
 , a sixth-rate commissioned in 1694
 , a frigate commissioned in 1698
 , a frigate commissioned in 1736 and used as a prison ship in the American Revolutionary War
 , a sloop commissioned in 1776
 , a cutter commissioned in 1860
 , a J-class destroyer commissioned in 1939 and sunk in 1941.
 , an Island-class patrol ship commissioned in 1976 and sold to Bangladesh in 1994 as BNS Shaheed Ruhul Amin.

Royal Navy ship names